Alcithoe aillaudorum is a species of sea snail, a marine gastropod mollusk in the family Volutidae, the volutes.

Description

Distribution

References

 Bail P. & Poppe G.T. 2001. A conchological iconography: a taxonomic introduction of the recent Volutidae. ConchBooks, Hackenheim. 30 pp, 5 pl

External links
  Intergovernmental Oceanographic Commission (IOC) of UNESCO. The Ocean Biogeographic Information System (OBIS)

Volutidae
Gastropods described in 1988